The BET Award for Best Female R&B/Pop Artist is awarded to the overall best female contemporary R&B, soul, and pop singers who have released an album the previous or same year. The all-time winner in this category is Beyoncé with ten wins; she is also the most nominated artist with sixteen nominations.

Winners and nominees 
Winners are listed first and highlighted in bold.

2000s

2010s

2020s

Multiple wins and nominations

Wins 

 10 wins
 Beyoncé

 3 wins
 Alicia Keys

 2 wins
 India Arie
 Mary J. Blige
 Rihanna

Nominations 

 16 nominations
 Beyoncé

 10 nominations
 Mary J. Blige
 Rihanna

 6 nominations
 Alicia Keys

 5 nominations
 H.E.R.

 4 nominations
 Jhené Aiko

 3 nominations
 India Arie
 Mariah Carey
 Ciara
 Keyshia Cole
 Jennifer Hudson
 K. Michelle
 Kehlani
 Jazmine Sullivan
 SZA
 Summer Walker

 2 nominations
 Aaliyah
 Marsha Ambrosius
 Amerie
 Erykah Badu
 Tamar Braxton
 Melanie Fiona
 Keri Hilson
 Janet Jackson
 Janelle Monáe
 Jill Scott
 Solange

See also

 List of music awards honoring women
 BET Award for Best Male R&B/Pop Artist

References 

BET Awards
Music awards honoring women